The Sacred Scriptures Bethel Edition (SSBE) is a Sacred Name Bible which uses the names Yahweh and Yahshua in both the Old and New Testaments (Chamberlin p. 51-3). It was produced by Jacob O. Meyer, based on the American Standard Version of 1901 and it contains over 977 pages. The Assemblies of Yahweh printed 5,500 copies of the first edition in 1981. It is also used by some members of the Sacred Name Movement.

History

Use
In the early years of the ministry, Jacob O. Meyer, the Directing Elder of the Assemblies of Yahweh, would preach using a King James Version (KJV) Bible, simply replacing Lord, Jesus and God by Yahweh and Yahshua. 

The KJV presented a problem in that, as pointed out by Bible scholars, there are numerous errors in the text. During the late 19th century and on to the early 20th century, a number of notable Bible translations came about which were more accurate than their predecessor, the KJV. These include the American Standard Version, the New International Version and the New American Standard Bible. The year 1966 saw the significant progressive step of a Bible produced by the Roman Catholic Church, the Jerusalem Bible. In their effort to be literal with their translation they retained the Sacred Name Yahweh in the Old Testament texts, but as a limited Sacred Name Bible did not include it in the New Testament texts. Other limited Sacred Name Bibles were produced such as the Anchor Bible, but none which seamlessly retained Yahweh (or indeed Yahshua) throughout the texts. This was one of the main reasons why the Sacred Scriptures Bethel Edition came in to being.

Based on the ASV
As Meyer studied Hebrew and Greek and the original texts, Meyer came to believe that most false doctrines found in modern religious teaching originated from the translation of the text into modern language, not in the original texts. For example, the SSBE does not use the term "cross" in reference to the death fixture used on the Messiah, but rather stake or pole.  Meyer chose the ASV as a basis for the SSBE translation as Meyer noticed that professors would often comment that the English language that would provide the best approximation of the original text was the American Standard Version. Meyer wrote in the preface of the Sacred Scriptures Bethel Edition:

A joint effort
As Meyer wished the Assemblies of Yahweh to be in complete unity, all reading from the same Bible rather than different people reading different versions, Meyer put out an annual report around the Feast of Tabernacles in 1980. 

In the annual report, he announced that the project of producing an accurate Bible translation would go forth for the glory of Almighty Yahweh. Firstly, the funds had to be acquired for typesetting, printing and binding expenses, as well as the cost of time spent reviewing, editing and making corrections. Donations came in from all over the world to complete the project. That, with securing a loan from the bank, made it possible to advance this project. In the Spring – Summer of 1981, editing was done to the text, assisted by office staff and Obadiah School of the Bible students. Because the editing work was being done in a time before the computer technology became common, editorial changes were all done by hand by Meyer. Not only were Yahweh and Yahshua put back in the text to replace LORD and Jesus but also the Hebrew titles Elohim, Eloah and El were also restored to the texts. Further, the Shakespearean English was updated to reflect the usage of language in the 20th century.

Published and distributed
The manuscripts were completed by Autumn in 1981. The Sacred Scriptures Bethel Edition went to press and was delivered to the International Headquarters between December 1981 and January 1982. The Assemblies of Yahweh have continuously had the SSBE on display at the altar table of the Bethel Meeting Hall opened to Psalm 101 – Psalm 103.

Sacred names

Sacred Name supporters often cite from passages such as  where, in the original Hebrew texts, YHWH is found. The name is found approximately 7,000 times in the Hebrew Scriptures. Some claim that the pronunciation was lost, or unknown. However, most prominent, authoritative reference works today do not support this view. The Encyclopedia Judaica makes the following statement:

Prominent religious leaders have agreed that Yahweh cannot be translated into any word exactly (Herbert Armstrong, pp. 128 – 129), while other Bible translators point out that the reason for not pronouncing Yahweh and producing the form Jehovah, was due to a misunderstanding of Jewish tradition (Anchor Bible, page XIV). Bible translations such as the Rotherham's Emphasized Bible, the Anchor Bible, and the Jerusalem Bible have retained the name Yahweh in the Old Testament. The SSBE is one of the few English Bible translations that uses Yahweh in both the Old Testament and the New Testament.

Notable aspects

Preface section 
The SSBE is distinguishable by its preface section, which describes the setting, language and name of the Bible. Evidence is offered to show how the rendering Jehovah is a serious mispronunciation of the Tetragrammaton. Among some of the terms used by scholars to describe the name Jehovah are "morphological monstrosity" and a "mispronunciation".

Meyer writes in the Sacred Name Broadcaster: "We as humans cannot choose the name which we personally wish to call him. He has already named himself  and that "the best transliteration of this name into English is spelled Yahweh, and is so pronounced". They therefore reject the English titles for God's name, claiming to trace such titles etymologically to the worship of other deities.

Corrected terms
The Sacred Scriptures Bethel Edition uses terms that Meyer felt were corrections from previous versions, including Yahweh in both the Old Testament and the New Testament. While Greek anarthrous "God" is rendered as Elohim (e.g. John 1:1c), the arthrous "the God" is mostly as "Yahweh" (e.g. John 1:1b). The name of the Messiah, commonly referred to as Jesus, is rendered as Yahshua. Instead of the Greek word Christ, it uses the Hebrew word Messiah, and instead of church it uses assembly. Also, the translation does not use the terms cross and crucify but torture stake and impale.

The Sacred Scriptures Bethel Edition concludes with a "pure religious vocabulary" section, which gives the explanation of words which should be avoided for those seeking "to purify their personal worship". The glossary of terms briefly traces and presents the etymology of words used frequently by Christian theologians that the translator claims are pagan in origin.

Editions

The Assemblies of Yahweh continue to use the SSBE as their preferred text. , it has undergone seven printings: 1981, 1986, 1989, 1993, 1997, 2001, 2008. The Sacred Scriptures Bethel Edition is available at at least one library in England and at least one in the United States and is used at Dalet School and Obadiah School of the Bible, both in Bethel, Pennsylvania.

See also
 Names and titles of God in the New Testament
 Nomina sacra

Notes

References

Bibliography

External links 

 
 Official Assemblies of Yahweh site

1981 non-fiction books
1981 in Christianity
Bible translations into English
Sacred Name Movement